Doris Gilbert (1914-1993) was an American screenwriter and TV writer known for her work on B movies of the 1940s and 1950s at Republic Pictures.

Biography 
Doris was the daughter of famed Russia-born composer L. Wolfe Gilbert and his wife, Catherine Oestreicher.

The family moved from New York to Los Angeles when Doris was a girl, and she got into screenwriting at a young age thanks to her father's involvement writing songs for movies at Fox. When she was still a teenager, she married lawyer Allen Feit, who she had met in NYC a year earlier. She continued to write under her maiden name.

During the 1940s, she began working at Republic, where she wrote films like Storm Over Lisbon and Lake Placid Serenade. During the 1950s and 1960s, she wrote scripts for over a dozen television shows, including Science Fiction Theatre and Adventures of Superman.

In 1941–42, Doris Gilbert collaborated with Sally Benson on a radio version of the latter's Junior Miss short stories. The series starred Shirley Temple.

Selected filmography 
For film:

 Geraldine (1953)
 Little Egypt (1951)
 Lake Placid Serenade (1944)
 Storm Over Lisbon (1944)
 Atlantic City (1944)
 Ladies Courageous (1944)

For TV:

 Bourbon Street Beat (1 episode, 1960) 
 Hotel de Paree (1 episode, 1959) 
 General Electric Theater (1 episode, 1959)
 Whirlybirds (1 episode, 1958)
 The New Adventures of Charlie Chan (1 episode, 1957) 
 Matinee Theatre (2 episodes, 1956–57)
 The Adventures of Hiram Holliday (1 episode, 1956) 
 The Millionaire (3 episodes, 1956)
 Science Fiction Theatre (6 episodes, 1955–56)
 TV Reader's Digest (1 episode, 1956) 
 The Ford Television Theatre (1 episode, 1955) 
 Mr. & Mrs. North (2 episodes, 1954)
 Rheingold Theatre (1 episode, 1954)
 The Loretta Young Show (1 episode, 1954) 
 The Unexpected (3 episodes, 1952) 
 Adventures of Superman (1 episode, 1952)

References 

1914 births
1993 deaths
Screenwriters from New York (state)
American women screenwriters
American television writers
20th-century American women writers
20th-century American screenwriters